Varallo Pombia is a comune (municipality) in the Province of Novara in the Italian region Piedmont (Piemonte), located about  northeast of Turin and about  north of Novara.

Varallo Pombia borders the following municipalities: Borgo Ticino, Castelletto sopra Ticino, Divignano, Pombia, and Somma Lombardo.

Demographic evolution

Twin towns — sister cities
Varallo Pombia is twinned with:

  Thionville, France
  Acciano, Italy

References

Cities and towns in Piedmont